An Anthology may refer to:

 An Anthology (Angel album), 1992
 An Anthology (Duane Allman album), 1972